Campert is a surname. Notable people with the surname include:

Remco Campert (born 1929), Dutch author, poet, and columnist
Jan Campert (1902–1943), Dutch author